Cyril St. John Stevenson (July 13, 1914 – November 6, 2006) was a Bahamian politician and newspaper publisher. Stevenson, Sir Henry Milton Taylor and William Cartwright, co-founded the Progressive Liberal Party (PLP) in 1953, the first national political party to be established in the Bahamas.

Biography
Stevenson was born in Nassau, Bahamas, on July 13, 1914. He was the youngest child of Henry Macauley "Harry" Stevenson and Georgianna Louise "Lulie" Stevenson. His father died in 1915 when he was just fifteen months old. He began a career in journalism as a reporter for the Bahamas Weekly News.

In 1953, Stevenson, Sir Henry Milton Taylor and William Cartwright, co-founded the Progressive Liberal Party (PLP). The following year, Stevenson became the editor and publisher of the now defunct newspaper, The Nassau Herald. At times, Stevenson used his editorial control of the Nassau Guardian to promote the views and candidates of his PLP party.

Stevenson was elected to the Bahamas House of Assembly, the lower house of Parliament, from the Andros and the Berry Islands constituency in 1956. He joined the "Magnificent Six," a group of six MPs who formed the first opposition block in the Bahamas parliament. The group of six PLP parliamentary members consisted of Stevenson, Randol Fawkes, Lynden Pindling, Milo Butler, Sammy Isaacs, and Clarence Bain. Stevenson was re-elected to the Assembly in the 1962 election, again representing portions of Andros Island and the Berry Islands. He lost his re-election in 1967, when he was as an independent candidate and left the PLP.

He retired from politics after his 1967 electoral defeat. Stevenson became head of the Bahamas Information Services, a government department, in 1970. He gave control of his printing business to family members that same year to focus on his work with the Bahamas Information Services. He remained head of the Bahamas Information Services until his retirement in 1985.

Stevenson was made a Member of the Royal Victorian Order in 1975. He received an award for contributions to journalism by The Bahamas Press Club in 1999. In 2000, Jones Communication Limited named Stevenson as a member of the 100 Most Outstanding Bahamians of the 20th Century.

Stevenson resided at his home at South Beach, New Providence, from 1961 to 2006.

Cyril Stevenson died on November 6, 2006, at the age of 92. He was survived by his wife of 47 years, June Ellen Stevenson (née Maplethorpe), and five children - William, Rae, Grace, Michael and Clarke. A state funeral was held at the Christ Church Cathedral in Nassau on November 16, 2006.

References

1914 births
2006 deaths
Members of the House of Assembly of the Bahamas
Progressive Liberal Party politicians
Bahamian businesspeople
Bahamian newspaper editors
Bahamian journalists
Bahamian newspaper publishers (people)
People from Nassau, Bahamas
20th-century businesspeople
20th-century journalists
20th-century Bahamian politicians